Sir John Ontario Miller  (7 August 1857 – 19 January 1943) was a British civil servant in India.  He was born in Toronto, Canada, the eldest son of Robert Schaw Miller and Eliza Miller. He died at Lavant, Sussex.

Early life

John Ontario Miller’s father died in Canada in 1862, forcing the family to move to Scotland. The following year his mother died in mid-1863 and he was raised by members of her family..  He was educated at King's College, University of Aberdeen after he won a bursary of £35 in 1874.

Career in India

Miller joined the Indian Civil Service in 1879.

He held various secretary positions from 1895 to 1907.  Miller was Chief Secretary to the North West Provinces and Oudh Administration 1899 to 1902, and was appointed a Companion of the Order of the Star of India (CSI) for his services in the New Year's Honours List 1 January 1901.

Miller served as a Secretary in the Government of India Revenue Department 1902  to 1903 and then as Chief Commissioner of Central Provinces and Berar from 1905 to 1907. He then became a member of the Viceroy Executive Council of India and Commissioner of Legyral Province from 1907 to 1910. For his distinguished work he was knighted as a Knight Commander of the Order of the Star of India (KCSI).

Later life in England, and family 

On his final return to Britain, Miller served as a London County Council (Non-Member) representative on the London Port Authority from 1916 to 1925,  He also served in the Ministry of Food (probably at the time of the First World War).

He was a founder of the London School of Economics and Political Science in 1895.  Miller was interested in the concept of "the currency question," and published two small books on the subject in 1920 and 1931.

He married Mary Evelyn Lyall, the youngest daughter of Alfred Comyn Lyall, in 1888.  Together they had three sons (one of whom died young in India) and two daughters. He brought his family back to the United Kingdom for short breaks in 1894, 1899 and 1901.

He was a grandson of William Mitchell (Scottish entrepreneur) (1781 - 1854).  One of his grandchildren is Richard L. Hills.

Notes

Knights Commander of the Order of the Star of India
1857 births
1943 deaths
Indian Civil Service (British India) officers
Alumni of the University of Aberdeen
People from Lavant, West Sussex